Senator Milton may refer to:

John Gerald Milton (1881–1977), U.S. Senator from New Jersey in 1938
John Watson Milton (born 1935), Minnesota State Senate
William Hall Milton (1864–1942), US Senator from Florida from 1908 to 1909

See also
Senator Melton (disambiguation)